David Bronson may refer to:

David Bronson (1800–1863), U.S. representative from Maine
David Bronson (born 1976), American singer-songwriter and music producer
Dave Bronson (born 1958), mayor of Anchorage, Alaska